The Madaba Map, also known as the Madaba Mosaic Map, is part of a floor mosaic in the early Byzantine church of Saint George in Madaba, Jordan. The Madaba Map depicts part of the Middle East and contains the oldest surviving original cartographic depiction of the Holy Land and especially Jerusalem. It dates to the sixth century AD.

History

The Madaba Mosaic Map depicts Jerusalem with the New Church of the Theotokos, which was dedicated on 20 November 542. Buildings erected in Jerusalem after 570 are absent from the depiction, thus limiting the date range of its creation to the period between 542 and 570. The mosaic was made by unknown artists, probably for the Christian community of Madaba, which was the seat of a bishop at that time.

In 614, Madaba was conquered by the Sasanian Empire. In the eighth century, the ruling Muslim Umayyad Caliphate had some figural motifs removed from the mosaic. In 746, Madaba was largely destroyed by an earthquake and subsequently abandoned.

The mosaic was rediscovered in 1884, during the construction of a new Greek Orthodox church on the site of its ancient predecessor. Patriarch Nicodemus I of Jerusalem was informed, but no research was carried out until 1896.

In the following decades, large portions of the mosaic map were damaged by fires, activities in the new church, and by the effects of moisture. In December 1964, the Volkswagen Foundation gave the Deutscher Verein zur Erforschung Palästinas (lit. "German Association for the Exploration of Palestine") 90,000 DM to save the mosaic. In 1965, the archaeologists Heinz Cüppers and Heinrich Brandt undertook the restoration and conservation of the remaining parts of the mosaic.

Description

The floor mosaic is located in the apse of the church of Saint George at Madaba. It is not oriented northward, as modern maps are, but faces east toward the altar in such a fashion that the position of places on the map coincides with the compass directions. Originally, it measured 21 by 7 m and contained more than two million tesserae. Its current dimensions are 16 by 5 m.

Topographic representation
The mosaic map depicts an area from Lebanon in the north to the Nile Delta in the south, and from the Mediterranean Sea in the west to the Eastern Desert. Among other features, it depicts the Dead Sea with two fishing boats, a variety of bridges linking the banks of the Jordan, fish swimming in the river and receding from the Dead Sea; a lion (rendered nearly unrecognisable by the insertion of random tesserae during a period of iconoclasm) hunting a gazelle in the Moab desert, palm-ringed Jericho, Bethlehem, and other biblical-Christian sites. The map may partially have served to facilitate pilgrims' orientation in the Holy Land. All landscape units are labelled with explanations in Greek. The mosaic's references to the tribes of Israel, toponymy, as well as its use of quotations of biblical passages, indicate that the artist who laid out the mosaic used the Onomasticon of Eusebius (fourth-century AD) as a primary source. A combination of folding perspective and an aerial view depicts approximately 150 towns and villages, all of them labelled.

The largest and most detailed element of the topographic depiction is Jerusalem, at the centre of the map. The mosaic clearly shows a number of significant structures in the Old City of Jerusalem: the Damascus Gate, the Lions' Gate, the Golden Gate, the Zion Gate, the Church of the Holy Sepulchre, the New Church of the Theotokos, the Tower of David, and the Cardo Maximus. On Jerusalem's southwest side is shown Acel Dama (lit. "field of blood"), from Christian liturgy. The recognisable depiction of the urban topography makes the mosaic a key source on Byzantine Jerusalem. Also unique are the detailed depictions of cities such as Neapolis, Askalon, Gaza, Pelusium, and Charachmoba, all of them nearly detailed enough to be described as street maps. Other designated sites include: Nicopolis; Beth Zachar[ias]; Bethlehem; Socho, now Kh. Shuweikah (southwest of Hebron); Beth Annaba; Saphitha; Jericho; Beit-ḥagla; Archelais; Modi'im; Lydda; Bethoron; Gibeon; Rama; Coreae; Maresha; Azotos Paralos (Ashdod-Coast); The Great Plain, literally meaning, "The Tribe of Dan"; Jamnia (Lit. "Jabneel, which is also Jamnia"), among other sites. One site represented on the map that is no longer extant are the stones at Gilgall which are clearly represented on the Madaba Map and may be hidden underneath one of the churches in Qas’r Al-Yahud  Many of these sites are marked on the mosaic map with various artistic vignettes representing the site in the Province of Palestina Tertia. For example, Jericho and Zoar are, both, represented by vignettes of date palm orchards. Zoar is seen on the far south-eastern side of the Dead Sea.

Scientific significance
The mosaic map of Madaba is the oldest known geographic floor mosaic in art history. It is used heavily for the localisation and verification of biblical sites. Study of the map played a major role in answering the question of the topographical location of Askalon (Asqalan on the map).

In 1967, excavations in the Jewish Quarter of Jerusalem revealed the Nea Church and the Cardo Maximus in the very locations suggested by the Madaba Map.

In February 2010, excavations further substantiated its accuracy with the discovery of a road depicted in the map that runs through the center of Jerusalem. According to the map, the main entrance to the city was through a large gate opening into a wide central street. Until the discovery, archaeologists were not able to excavate this site due to heavy pedestrian traffic. In the wake of infrastructure work near the Jaffa Gate, large paving stones were discovered at a depth of four meters below ground that prove such a road existed.

Copies of the Madaba Map
 The Archaeological Institute of Göttingen University contains a copy of the map in its archive collections. This copy was produced during the conservation work at Madaba in 1965 by archaeologists of the Rheinisches Landesmuseum, Trier. 
 A copy produced by students of the Madaba Mosaic School is in the foyer of the Akademisches Kunstmuseum at Bonn.
The lobby of the YMCA in Jerusalem has a small replica of the Jerusalem part of the map incorporated in its floor.

See also
Early Byzantine mosaics in the Middle East
Chronological list of early Christian geographers and pilgrims to the Holy Land who wrote about their travels, and other related works
Late Roman and Byzantine period
Eusebius of Caesarea (260/65–339/40), Church historian and geographer of the Holy Land
"Pilgrim of Bordeaux" (333-4), who left travel descriptions in the Itinerarium Burdigalense
Egeria, pilgrim to the Holy Land (c. 381-384) who left a detailed travel account
Jerome (Hieronymus; fl. 386-420), translator of the Vulgate version of the Bible, brought an important contribution to the topography of the Holy Land
Anonymous pilgrim of Piacenza, pilgrim to the Holy Land (570s) who left travel descriptions
Early Muslim period
Chronicon Paschale, seventh-century Greek Christian chronicle of the world
Arculf, Frankish Bishop and pilgrim to the Holy Land (c. 680) who left a detailed narrative of his travels
Medieval period
John of Würzburg, priest and pilgrim to the Holy Land (1160s) who left travel descriptions

References

Bibliography

Early sources
 
 
Palmer, P.; Dr. Guthe (1906), Die Mosaikkarte von Madeba, Im Auftrage des Deutschen Vereins zur Erforschung Palätinas

Later sources
 .
Madden, Andrew M., "A New Form of Evidence to Date the Madaba Map Mosaic," Liber Annuus 62 (2012), 495-513.
 Hepper, Nigel; Taylor, Joan, "Date Palms and Opobalsam in the Madaba Mosaic Map," Palestine Exploration Quarterly, 136,1 (April 2004), 35-44.
 Herbert Donner: The Mosaic Map of Madaba. Kok Pharos Publishing House, Kampen 1992, 
 
 Avi-Yonah, M.: The Madaba mosaic map. Israel Exploration Society, Jerusalem 1954
 Michele Piccirillo: Chiese e mosaici di Madaba. Studium Biblicum Franciscanum, Collectio maior 34, Jerusalem 1989 (Arabische Edition: Madaba. Kana'is wa fusayfasa''', Jerusalem 1993)
 Kenneth Nebenzahl: Maps of the Holy Land, images of Terra Sancta through two millennia. Abbeville Press, New York 1986, 
 Adolf Jacoby: Das geographische Mosaik von Madaba, Die älteste Karte des Heiligen Landes. Dieterich’sche Verlagsbuchhandlung, Leipzig 1905
Weitzmann, Kurt, ed., Age of spirituality: late antique and early Christian art, third to seventh century'', no. 523, 1979, Metropolitan Museum of Art, New York,

External links

 Article on the map and its Göttingen copy (in German)1999 (PDF)
 Madaba Map
 The Madaba Mosaic Map at the Franciscan Archaeological Institute
 Madaba Mosaic Map web page at San Francisco State University
  Byzantine Jerusalem and the Madaba Map
 Madaba Map at Bibleplaces.com

6th century maps
History of Jordan
Medieval Jerusalem
Byzantine mosaics
Archaeological discoveries in Jordan
Old maps of Jerusalem
Historic maps of the Roman Empire
1884 archaeological discoveries
Maps of Palestine (region)